Michael Dobson (born August 12, 1966) is a Canadian voice actor and voice director, who works for various studios in British Columbia, Canada. He voiced Starscream in the Transformers Unicron Trilogy (Armada, Energon, and Cybertron), Supreme Kai and Nappa in the Ocean dub of Dragon Ball Z, Cobra Commander in G.I. Joe: Spy Troops and G.I. Joe: Valor vs. Venom, Blob in X-Men: Evolution, Leonardo in Ninja Turtles: The Next Mutation, Big Ears in Make Way for Noddy, Bulk Biceps in My Little Pony: Friendship Is Magic, Bull Dog in Krypto the Superdog and Pythor in Ninjago.

Personal life
Michael Dobson is the oldest of the three Dobson brothers. His younger brothers Paul Dobson and Brian Dobson are also voice actors.

He owns a voice recording studio Makena Sound Ltd. in South Surrey, British Columbia.

Filmography

Animation

Anime English dubbing

Films

Live-action

Video games

References

External links

Michael Dobson at Crystal Acids Voice Actor Database

1966 births
20th-century Canadian male actors
21st-century Canadian male actors
Living people
Canadian male video game actors
Canadian male voice actors
Male actors from Vancouver
Canadian voice directors